Victor Joseph Travagliante (born July 8, 1985) is an American professional wrestling commentator currently signed to WWE, where he works under the stage name Vic Joseph and serves as the play-by-play commentator on WWE NXT.

Biography

Early years 
Before WWE, he worked as a commentator for Absolute Intense Wrestling (AIW) and House of Hardcore (HOH). Outside of professional wrestling, Travagliante has previously worked for the Cleveland Browns Radio Network on its 92.3 The Fan station, covering Cleveland Browns football games.

WWE (2017–present) 
In May 2017, it was announced that Joseph would join the commentary team of Main Event beginning on May 24, 2017, replacing Tom Phillips. On June 13, 2017, Joseph announced that he joins as play-by-play commentator for 205 Live, while still also participating on Main Event. On October 17, 2018, Joseph debuted as a play-by-play commentator on NXT UK, alongside Nigel McGuinness and also on 205 Live the next day.

On August 19, 2019, Joseph appeared as a guest commentator on Raw, as part of a commentary team filling in for Corey Graves and Jerry Lawler.

On September 30, 2019, Joseph announced that he is the new play-by-play commentator role on Raw, replacing Michael Cole where he was moved back to Friday Night SmackDown on Fox.

On January 27, 2020, Joseph left the announce team on Raw and was replaced on play-by-play commentary by Tom Phillips, along with his former SmackDown Live commentary team member Byron Saxton. On July 17, 2020, Joseph made his return to the 205 Live broadcast team alongside Drew Gulak to replace Byron Saxton. On August 12, 2020, Joseph joined the NXT commentary team.

References

External links 
 

Living people
Findlay Oilers men's basketball players
Professional wrestling announcers
1985 births